George Hiew Vun Zin is a Malaysian politician who has served as the Member of Sabah State Legislative Assembly (MLA) for Karamunting since May 2018. He served as the State Assistant Minister of Housing and Local Government of Sabah in the Heritage Party (WARISAN) administration under former Chief Minister Shafie Apdal and former Minister Jaujan Sambakong from May 2018 to the collapse of the WARISAN administration in September 2020. He is a member of the Parti Gagasan Rakyat Sabah (GAGASAN), a component party of the Gabungan Rakyat Sabah (GRS) coalition and was a member of WARISAN. He was also Member of the Supreme Council and Division Chief of Sandakan of WARISAN. On 4 March 2023, he left WARISAN for GAGASAN.

Election results

References

Living people
Sabah Heritage Party politicians
Members of the Sabah State Legislative Assembly
1979 births
People from Sandakan